＃AnneFrank. Parallel Stories is a 2019 English-language Italian feature-length docufiction film, directed by Sabina Fedeli and Anna Migotto and narrated by Helen Mirren. In American theaters it premiered on January 22, 2020 on a limited release, while on Netflix it premiered on July 2, 2020.

Critics consider the film to be a moving documentary about the Holocaust that would help young viewers connect to a valuable past. The Guardian described the film as targeted at young people through an educational stance. Critics have also read the hashtagging of key phrases (in contemporary social media fashion) by the young character in the fiction part of the film as the clear inspiration for the film's title.

Content 
The film opens with a young Ugg boots-wearing/nose-ringed European girl (Martina Gatti), whom we would later know by the name #KaterinaKat, scanning a secluded tree-surrounded spot that would soon be revealed as the location of a former concentration camp, the Bergen-Belsen camp. She would also be revealed as a young Anne Frank fan in present time, curious about the young Anne, who has been travelling by rail to various historical sites in Europe before ending her journey in Frank's reconstructed hiding room in Amsterdam. Throughout her journey, #KaterinaKat would post her thoughts and pictures on Instagram, hashtagging key phrases.

Meanwhile, Academy Award-winning actress Helen Mirren would, from Frank's reconstructed Amsterdam hiding room, introduce Frank's story through words from Frank's diary.

Intermittently through the film's progress, there would also be paralleling stories from five surviving children of the Holocaust who appear in the film along with their grandchildren. These five survivors interviewed in the film are Arianna Szörenyi, Sarah Lichtsztejn-Montard, Helga Weiss and sisters Andra and Tatiana Bucci. Frank would have been 90 years old during the film's 2019 release, and her story is intertwined in the film with narratives from these five Holocaust survivors who were more or less Frank's age during World War II. These survivors' testimonies, which create parallels between their past and Frank's, would also alternate with those from their children and grandchildren, creating parallels between the past and the present.

Cast 

 Helen Mirren
 Arianna Szorenyi
 Fanny Hochbaum
 Sarah Lichtsztejn-Montard
 Andra Bucci
 Helga Weiss
 Martina Gatti as #KaterinaKat

Production 
Anne Frank's hiding room in Amsterdam was reconstructed to the detail by set designers from the Piccolo Theatre in Milan.

Style 
The documentary was made in the docufiction style.

Release 
The film was released in Australia on 17 October 2019, in Italy on 11 November 2019, in the United States on 22 January 2020, and on Netflix on 2 July 2020.

Reception

Box office 
The film peaked at #16 on the Australian box office in the week ending 20 October 2019.

Critical reception 
The film was received positively by critics. On the review aggregation website Rotten Tomatoes, the film holds an 89% approval rating based on 9 reviews.

Roger Moore of Movie Nation said that the film's story is "a hard story to screw up, and appreciating its simple authority, how quickly this one breezes by and how moving it is in the end, they didn't." Peter Bradshaw, writing for The Guardian, called the film a "heartfelt and valuable documentary." Renuka Vyavahare reviewed the film for The Times of India, celebrating how the "documentary reminds us how integral freedom is for our survival and existence."

But the film was not without detractors. Writing for mint lounge, Somak Ghoshal criticized the film for turning "the victim of a horrific historical tragedy into a hashtag."

References

External links 

 
 #AnneFrank. Parallel Stories at Box Office Mojo
 
 #AnneFrank. Parallel Stories on YouTube

2019 films
2019 documentary films
2019 independent films
Italian coming-of-age films
Coming-of-age films based on actual events
Films set in the 1940s
Italian independent films
Italian documentary films
Films about genocide
Films about antisemitism
Jewish culture
Documentary films about race and ethnicity
Films about race and ethnicity
Films about social media
2010s English-language films
2010s Italian films